Harrison Township is one of the nine townships of Montgomery County, Ohio, United States. As of the 2020 census, the population was 21,814.

Geography
Located in the central part of the county, it borders the following township and cities:
Butler Township - north
Vandalia - northeast
Huber Heights - northeast corner
Dayton - east and south
Riverside - east
Trotwood - west
Clayton - northwest

Most of the original Harrison Township area has been incorporated into the city of Dayton, the county seat of Montgomery County.  Three census-designated places occupy most of the unincorporated parts of the township:
Fort McKinley, occupying the southwest of the western "island" around Salem Avenue.
Shiloh, occupying all of the western "island" around N. Main St. except for Fort McKinley and a small section in the northeast
Northridge, occupying all of the central "island" along N. Dixie Drive from Stop Eight Road to the north, and Embury Park Road, and Great Miami River to the south. There is also a small section northeast of Needmore and Wagner Ford Rd. that is known locally as Eldorado.

Name and history
It is one of nineteen Harrison Townships statewide.

Government
The township is governed by a three-member board of trustees, who are elected in November of odd-numbered years to a four-year term beginning on the following January 1. Two are elected in the year after the presidential election and one is elected in the year before it. There is also an elected township fiscal officer, who serves a four-year term beginning on April 1 of the year after the election, which is held in November of the year before the presidential election. Vacancies in the fiscal officership or on the board of trustees are filled by the remaining trustees.

Police services are provided in the township through a contract with the Montgomery County Sheriff’s Office.

Education 
Children from Harrison Township attend the schools of Northridge Local Schools, Dayton Public Schools and six public charter schools in the township.

References

External links
County website

Townships in Montgomery County, Ohio
Townships in Ohio